Alex & Amie is a 2019 Philippine television comedy series broadcast by GMA Network. Directed by Mhyk Vergara and Michael Christian Cardoz, it stars Mikael Daez and Caprice Cayetano in the title role. It premiered on May 20, 2019 on the network's morning line up replacing Bleach. The series concluded on May 31, 2019, with a total of 10 episodes. It was replaced by Jackie Chan Adventures in its timeslot.

The series is streaming online on YouTube.

Cast and characters

Lead cast
 Mikael Daez as Alexander "Alex" Sablay
 Max Collins as Bing Lopez
 Caprice Mendez as the voice of Amie

Supporting cast
 Dominic Roco as Patrick Santos
 Dexter Doria as Carmela "Mel" Ronquillo-Diaz
 Leanne Bautista as Tiny Mendoza
 Maey Bautista as Rita Reyes
 Katrina Mae Columna as Beyoncé Bautista
 Kenken Nuyad as Mikey Abeza
 Seth dela Cruz as Dylar Licayco
 JM Ventenilla as Peter Reyes
 Raki Diga as the voice of Panchito, Balut and Kapitan Dilim

Guest cast
 David Remo as young Alex

References

External links
 

2019 Philippine television series debuts
2019 Philippine television series endings
Filipino-language television shows
GMA Network original programming
GMA Integrated News and Public Affairs shows
Philippine comedy television series
Television shows set in the Philippines